The Strategic Culture Foundation (SCF) is a Russian think tank based in Moscow (founded in 2005) that primarily publishes an online current affairs magazine of the same name. SCF is regarded as an arm of Russian state interests by the United States government.

SCF has been characterized as a conservative, pro-Russian propaganda website by U.S. media and others.

SCF has a pattern of sharing articles with other Russia-controlled outlets such as Global Research, New Eastern Outlook, and SouthFront.

The Washington Post reported in September 2020 that Facebook had banned a Russian disinformation network operated by SCF—a network that "helped spread conspiracy theories aimed at English-speaking audiences, including by fueling false rumors that the coronavirus was produced as a bioweapon and that a potential vaccine would include tracking technology." The Posts report stated that the Strategic Culture Foundation “also spread false information that Bill Gates, the tech executive and philanthropist, was leading efforts to create a vaccine with surveillance capabilities.”  The Posts report called the Strategic Culture Foundation “a phony think tank”.

In April 2021, the United States Department of the Treasury imposed sanctions on SCF because of their efforts to interfere in the 2020 elections. According to the United States Department of State, the SCF journal "is directed by Russia's Foreign Intelligence Service (SVR) and closely affiliated with Russia's Ministry of Foreign Affairs."

References

External links 

 

Russian propaganda organizations
Disinformation operations
Russian entities subject to the U.S. Department of the Treasury sanctions